Keith Ferguson (July 23, 1946 – April 29, 1997) was an American bass guitarist, best remembered as a member of the blues rock band, The Fabulous Thunderbirds, based in Austin, Texas. Ferguson received several awards for his musicianship.

Biography
Ferguson was born July 23, 1946, and raised in the 'Sexto' – the Sixth Ward of Houston Texas, where he graduated from San Jacinto High School in 1964.

In 1969 he joined "Sunnyland Special", a blues band with Angela Strehli and Lewis Cowdrey. They recorded a 45rpm single. In 1972 he joined "Black Kangaroo" with guitarist Peter Kaukonen, and toured with them. In 1974 he played in the "Nightcrawlers" together with Stevie Ray Vaughan. Keith also played with Rocky Hill at that time.

In 1976, Ferguson joined The Fabulous Thunderbirds, along with vocalists Lou Ann Barton and Kim Wilson and guitarist Jimmie Vaughan. (Barton left soon after the group began.) The band had an initial large local following, but was unable to maintain a sustained following with commercially positive results. More than five years of being dropped by small and large record labels, with Chrysalis Records being the last in their initial period to drop the band, there was a hiatus of several years, during which time a re-shuffling of band members began to take place, and Ferguson was one of the first to leave.

Ferguson went on to become a member of the Tailgators along with Don Leady and Gary "Mudcat" Smith.

After leaving the Tailgators, Ferguson freelanced with a number of Austin blues bands on the 6 Street blues circuit and played with the Excellos and the Solid Senders.

He died of liver failure at the age of 50, on April 29, 1997, due in part to a nearly thirty-year addiction to heroin.

In 2014, a biography was written by author Detlef Schmidt: Keith Ferguson: Texas Blues Bass.

Discography

With the Fabulous Thunderbirds
 1979  Girls Go Wild
 1980  What's the Word
 1981  Butt Rockin'
 1982  T-Bird Rhythm
 1996  Different Tacos
 2003  Thunderbirds Tacos Deluxe

With the Tailgators
 1985 Swamp Rock
 1986 Mumbo Jumbo
 1987 Tore Up
 1988 Hide Your Eyes
 1989 OK Let's Go

With other artists
 1983  Havana Moon with Carlos Santana
 1983  Check This Action with LeRoi Brothers
 1994  Let The Dogs Run with Mike Morgan and Jim Suhler

Awards
1997: Austin Music Hall of Fame Inductee
1985: Austin Music Awards, Best Bass Guitar

References

Archival Materials

 Keith Ferguson papers at Southwest Collection/Special Collections Library, Texas Tech University
 Keith Ferguson digital collection, 1951-2008, at Southwest Collection/Special Collections Library, Texas Tech University
 Margaret Ferguson papers at Southwest Collection/Special Collections Library, Texas Tech University

1946 births
1997 deaths
American rock bass guitarists
American male bass guitarists
Deaths from liver failure
Musicians from Austin, Texas
20th-century American bass guitarists
Guitarists from Texas
The Fabulous Thunderbirds members
20th-century American male musicians